South Columbus may refer to:

South Columbus, Ohio
South Columbus, Georgia
South Columbus Historic District, Columbus, Mississippi
South Columbus High School, Tabor City, North Carolina